Asian Luge Championship (Asian Luge Cup before 2015) is annual luge competition for Asian countries, which held since 1998. There are men's and women's single events and men's double event. Most part of editions of Asian Luge Championship held by Spiral track at Nagano, Japan.

Host cities
 1998–2016: Nagano, Japan
 2017: Altenberg, Germany
 2018–2021: Not held
 2022: Pyeongchang, South Korea

Men's singles

Asian Cup

Asian Championship

Women's singles

Asian Cup

Asian Championship

References
Spiral track official website 
keshavan

Sport in Asia
Luge competitions
Luge